Aphasiology is a monthly scientific journal covering the field of aphasias.

References

Aphasias
Linguistics journals
Neuroscience journals
Publications established in 1987